The 2019–20 season was Al-Raed's twelfth consecutive season in Pro League and their 66th year in existence. This season Al-Raed participated in the Pro League and King Cup. 

The season covers the period from 1 July 2019 to 10 September 2020.

Players

Squad information

Out on loan

Transfers and loans

Transfers in

Loans in

Transfers out

Loans out

Competitions

Overview

Goalscorers

Last Updated: 4 September 2020

Assists

Last Updated: 19 August 2020

Clean sheets

Last Updated: 9 August 2020

References

Al-Raed FC seasons
Raed